Kkondae Intern is a 2020 South Korean television series starring Park Hae-jin and Kim Eung-soo. The workplace comedy-drama series is about what happens when a man finally gets a chance to lord over a previous boss, who made his life miserable during his rookie days with the his old school ways. It airs every Wednesday and Thursday starting from May 20, 2020 on MBC TV.

Synopsis
Kkondae Intern is an office comedy that depicts a man's delightful revenge on his previous boss who is also the worst manager.

Ka Yeol-chan (Park Hae-jin) had a bad internship experience because of a nasty and an overbearing boss. He quits his job and starts working in a ramen company. With his sheer hard work, he develops a chicken noodle which becomes a top product and gets elevated to the position of a general manager.

Lee Man-sik (Kim Eung-soo) is a manager at Ongol Ramen Department, and has a reputation as a "terror senior".

After 30 years in the company, he loses hope of being promoted to an executive position before retirement. So he takes and passes the Senior Internship at Junsu Food.

A reversal of fate occurs and now Lee Man-sik starts working as an intern at the same company and is assigned under Ka Yeol-chan.

Cast

Main
 Park Hae-jin as Ka Yeol-chan
 Kim Eung-soo as Lee Man-sik

Supporting
 Han Ji-eun as Lee Tae-ri.
  One of the three Intern that join Sales & Marketing Team of Joonsu Food. Daughter of Lee Man-sik.
Park Ki-woong as Namgoong Joon-soo
  President of Joonsu Food. Son of Namgoong Pyo.
Park Ah-in as Tak Jung-eun
  Contract worker under Sales & Marketing Team of Joonsu Food. Ex-Girlfriend of Ka Yeol-Chan.
 Noh Jong-hyun as Joo Yoon-soo
   One of the three Intern that join Sales & Marketing Team of Joonsu Food.
 Go Geon-han as Oh Dong-geun
 Kim Hyun-mok as Park Cheol-min
 Hong Seung-bum as Kim Seung-jin
 Kim Sun-young as Koo Ja-sook
 Son Jong-hak as An Sang-jong
 Ko In-beom as Namgoong pyo
  Chairman of Joonsu Food. Father of Namgoong Joon-soo.
 Kim Ki-cheon as Eom Han-gil
 Moon Sook as Ok-kyung
 Jang Sung-kyu as Park Beom-jun

Original soundtrack

Ratings
 In this table,  represent the lowest ratings and  represent the highest ratings.
 N/A denotes that the rating is not known.

Awards and nominations

Notes

References

External links
  
  
 
 

MBC TV television dramas
Korean-language television shows
2020 South Korean television series debuts
2020 South Korean television series endings
South Korean comedy television series
South Korean comedy-drama television series
Workplace comedy television series
Wavve original programming